Robert Barrier (21 December 1907, Bellegarde-sur-Valserine - 7 December 1955) was a French politician. He represented the Democratic and Socialist Union of the Resistance (UDSR) in the National Assembly from 1951 to 1955.

References

1907 births
1955 deaths
People from Valserhône
Politicians from Auvergne-Rhône-Alpes
Young Republic League politicians
Democratic and Socialist Union of the Resistance politicians
Deputies of the 2nd National Assembly of the French Fourth Republic
French military personnel of World War II
French Resistance members